Lapachol is a natural phenolic compound isolated from the bark of the lapacho tree. This tree is known botanically as Handroanthus impetiginosus, but was formerly known by various other botanical names such as Tabebuia avellanedae. Lapachol is also found in other species of Handroanthus.

Lapachol is usually encountered as a yellow, skin-irritating powder from wood. Chemically, it is a derivative of vitamin K.

Once studied as a possible treatment for some types of cancer, it is now considered too toxic for use.

See also 
 Hooker reaction

References 

1,4-Naphthoquinones
Hydroxynaphthoquinones
Plant toxins